List of World Cup finals  may refer to:

 List of FIFA World Cup finals, in association football
 List of Rugby League World Cup finals, in rugby league football
 List of Cricket World Cup finals, in cricket